Brian Cvilikas (born March 16, 1984 in Highlands Ranch, Colorado) is a former American soccer player. He now is a US Soccer Federation certified A License Coach.

Career

College and Amateur
Cvilikas grew up in Colorado, attending Highlands Ranch High School where he was a first team All State soccer player. He then attended Old Dominion University where he played on the men's college soccer team from 2002 to 2005.  He was the 2005 CAA Player of the Year, and was named College Soccer News and Soccer America National Player of the Week. He led the CAA in scoring with 15 goals. He earned NSCAA All-American honors. In 2005, preceding his senior year, Cvilikas played for Williamsburg Legacy in the USL Premier Development League.

Professional
In January 2006, the NY MetroStars selected him in the third round (twenty-sixth overall) in the 2006 MLS Supplemental Draft. He appeared several times with their reserve team along with the Columbus Crew. He then signed with the Virginia Beach Mariners.  In 2007, Cvilikas moved to the Wilmington Hammerheads, playing with them until August 2008 and receiving Team Offensive MVP honors.  On August 13, 2008, the Minnesota Thunder of the USL First Division signed him.

On February 19, 2010, the team established a new name and ownership as NSC Minnesota Stars of the USSF Division 2 and re-signed him. The league changed to the North American Soccer League the following season and the club went on to win the 2011 NASL Championship.

References

External links
 Minnesota Thunder bio 
 Old Dominian Monarchs bio

1984 births
Living people
American soccer players
Old Dominion Monarchs men's soccer players
USL First Division players
USL Second Division players
Virginia Beach Mariners players
Wilmington Hammerheads FC players
Legacy 76 players
Minnesota Thunder players
Minnesota United FC (2010–2016) players
USL League Two players
USSF Division 2 Professional League players
North American Soccer League players
New York Red Bulls draft picks
Soccer players from Colorado
People from Highlands Ranch, Colorado
Association football forwards